Dichomeris chalybitis is a moth in the family Gelechiidae. It was described by Edward Meyrick in 1920. It is found in Tanzania.

References

Endemic fauna of Tanzania
Moths described in 1920
chalybitis